The Zamba Toy is a river of Khost Province (formerly in Paktia Province), southeastern Afghanistan. It flows past the village of Zambar.

References

Rivers of Afghanistan
Landforms of Khost Province